The Chandos Chair of Medicine and Anatomy is a Chair in Medicine and Anatomy of the University of St Andrews, Scotland. It was established in 1721, by a bequest of £1000 from James Brydges, 1st Duke of Chandos - then the Chancellor of the university.  His original aim was to establish a Chair of Eloquence, although this was rejected by the university in favour of a chair in Medicine and Anatomy.  Holders of the Chandos Chair are known as Chandos Professors.  The Chandos Chair still exists today, although in 1875 it became a chair in physiology.

 Thomas Simson 1722-1764
 James Simson 1764-1770
 James Flint 1770-1811
 Robert Briggs 1811-1840
 John Reid 1841-1849
 George Edward Day 1849-1863
 James Bell Pettigrew 1875-1905 
 Percy Theodore Herring 1908-1948 - first described Herring bodies
 Anthony Elliot Ritchie 1948-1969
 Joseph Fairweather Lamb 1969-1993
 Ian Johnston 1997-present

Sources

1721 establishments in Scotland
Professorships in medicine
University of St Andrews